The 1993–94 daytime network television schedule for the four major English-language commercial broadcast networks in the United States covers the weekday and weekend daytime hours from September 1993 to August 1994.

Legend

 New series are highlighted in bold.

Schedule
 All times correspond to U.S. Eastern and Pacific Time scheduling (except for some live sports or events). Except where affiliates slot certain programs outside their network-dictated timeslots, subtract one hour for Central, Mountain, Alaska, and Hawaii-Aleutian times.
 Local schedules may differ, as affiliates have the option to pre-empt or delay network programs. Such scheduling may be limited to preemptions caused by local or national breaking news or weather coverage (which may force stations to tape delay certain programs in overnight timeslots or defer them to a co-operated station or digital subchannel in their regular timeslot) and any major sports events scheduled to air in a weekday timeslot (mainly during major holidays). Stations may air shows at other times at their preference.

Monday–Friday

Saturday

Sunday

By network

ABC

Returning series:
ABC Weekend Special
ABC World News This Morning
ABC World News Tonight with Peter Jennings
The Addams Family
All My Children
The Bugs Bunny and Tweety Show
General Hospital
Good Morning America
The Home Show
Land of the Lost 
Loving
One Life to Live
Schoolhouse Rock!
This Week with David Brinkley
Wild West C.O.W.-Boys of Moo Mesa

New series:
CityKids
Cro
Mike and Maty
Sonic the Hedgehog
Tales from the Cryptkeeper

Not returning from 1992-93:
Darkwing Duck
Goof Troop
A Pup Named Scooby-Doo

CBS

Returning series:
As the World Turns
The Bold and the Beautiful
CBS Evening News
CBS Morning News
CBS News Sunday Morning
CBS Storybreak 
CBS This Morning
The Little Mermaid
Face the Nation
Garfield and Friends
Guiding Light
The Price Is Right
Teenage Mutant Ninja Turtles
The Young and the Restless

New series:
All-New Dennis the Menace
Beakman's World
Cadillacs and Dinosaurs
Conan and the Young Warriors
Marsupilami

Not returning from 1992-93:
The Amazing Live Sea Monkeys
Back to the Future
Cyber C.O.P.S.
Raw Toonage
Fievel's American Tails
Grimmy

Fox

Returning series:
Batman: The Animated Series
Bobby's World
Dog City
Eek! The Cat
Merrie Melodies Starring Bugs Bunny & Friends
Taz-Mania
Tiny Toon Adventures 
Tom & Jerry Kids
X-Men

New series:
Animaniacs
Droopy, Master Detective
Mighty Morphin Power Rangers
The Terrible Thunderlizards
Thunderbirds USA
Where on Earth Is Carmen Sandiego?

Not returning from 1992-93:
Alvin and the Chipmunks 
Beetlejuice 
George of the Jungle 
Mighty Mouse: The New Adventures 
The Plucky Duck Show
Super Dave: Daredevil for Hire

NBC

Returning series:
Another World
Brains and Brawn
Caesars Challenge
California Dreams
Classic Concentration 
Days of Our Lives
John and Leeza from Hollywood (retitled Leeza)
Meet the Press
Name Your Adventure
NBA Inside Stuff
NBC News at Sunrise
NBC Nightly News
Saturday Today
Today

New series:
The Jane Whitney Show
Running the Halls
Saved by the Bell: The New Class

Not returning from 1992-93:
Double Up
Dr. Dean
The Faith Daniels Show
Family Secrets
Santa Barbara
Saved by the Bell
Scattergories
Scrabble

See also
1993-94 United States network television schedule (prime-time)
1993-94 United States network television schedule (late night)

Sources
https://web.archive.org/web/20071015122215/http://curtalliaume.com/abc_day.html
https://web.archive.org/web/20071015122235/http://curtalliaume.com/cbs_day.html
https://web.archive.org/web/20071012211242/http://curtalliaume.com/nbc_day.html

United States weekday network television schedules
1993 in American television
1994 in American television